Karl Schwegler (born 17 September 1902, date of death missing) was a Swiss rower who competed in the 1928 Summer Olympics.

In 1928 he won the silver medal as member of the Swiss boat in the coxed fours competition.

References

External links
 profile

1902 births
Year of death missing
Swiss male rowers
Olympic rowers of Switzerland
Rowers at the 1928 Summer Olympics
Olympic silver medalists for Switzerland
Olympic medalists in rowing
Medalists at the 1928 Summer Olympics